South Camden is a neighborhood in Camden, New Jersey. Located in the southern part of the city, below Central Waterfront and east of the Port of Camden on the Delaware River. Interstate 676 runs through the neighborhood.

The South Camden Historic District, bounded by Jackson St, South Fourth St, Chelton Ave, and Railroad Avenue, comprises  and 608 buildings, including the headquarters of the defunct South Camden Trust Company.

New York Shipbuilding Corporation, in the Port of Camden, was located many years along the waterfront on the west side of the neighborhood and once was its largest employer. The Camden Shipyard & Maritime Museum record its history.

In July 2014, the New Jersey Economic Development Authority awarded the Holtec International a $260 million tax incentive to expand operations at the site in the Port of Camden. 
The proposed Glassboro–Camden Line light rail system would stop in the neighbourhood at Ferry Avenue parallel and west of the North-South Freeway.

In September 2010 Waterfront South Theatre, home of the South Camden Theatre Company (SCTC), open as  Camden's first live theatre space built in more than 100 years. 

In August 2014, ground was broken on Phoenix  Park, which will provide access to the waterfront on land previously used for industry.

References

External links
Geraldine Dodge Foundation

Neighborhoods in Camden, New Jersey
History of Camden, New Jersey
National Register of Historic Places in Camden County, New Jersey
Historic districts on the National Register of Historic Places in New Jersey
New Jersey Register of Historic Places
Historic districts in Camden County, New Jersey